Svetlana Selezneva (born 1969) is a Russian mathematician, Dr.Sc., Associate professor, a professor at the Faculty of Computer Science at the Moscow State University.

She defended the thesis «Polynomial representations of discrete functions» for the degree of Doctor of Physical and Mathematical Sciences (2016).

She is the author of three books and more than 70 scientific articles.

References

Bibliography

External links
 MSU CMC
 Scientific works of Svetlana Selezneva
 Scientific works of Svetlana Selezneva

Russian computer scientists
Russian women computer scientists
Russian mathematicians
Living people
People from Korosten
Academic staff of Moscow State University
1969 births
Moscow State University alumni